Sinthan Top is a mountain pass, a popular tourist destination located between South Kashmir's Breng Valley (Sub-District Kokernag) in Anantnag district and Kishtwar district of Chenab Valley in the Indian union territory of Jammu and Kashmir. Majority of the area lies on the Kishtwar side. The top acts as a  sort of base camp to several alpine lakes in the region.

Location 
The Sinthan pass connects Anantnag with Kishtwar and is the only road that connects the people of Warwan and Marwah (Marye) of Kishtwar district with district headquarters in Kishtwar town. It is located on the Anantnag–Kokernag–Kishtwar section of  NH 244, and is 80 km from Kishtwar town, 130 km south of Srinagar and 73 km from Anantnag and 48 km from Kokernag. Sinthan Top has no local population. Shepherds from adjoining places like Kokernag, Daksum, and tourists and those working in the tourism industry may stay overnight in tents.

Tourism 
Like other areas of the valley, Sinthan Top is known for its beauty and wonderful tourist attractions. The place is fast growing as one of the top tourist destination in Chenab valley. Around 37 kilometers of snaky and uphill drive from Daksum, it offers an adventurous journey. The spot is emerging for mountaineering, trekking and skiing.

Sinthan Top is easily accessible from Srinagar, almost 4–5 hours drive by car. Attractions in Kashmir like Kokernag, Dacksum and Achabal fall en route that offer tourists varied choice of resting and makes traveling more pleasant and less tiresome. At the spot called '360 Degree View', one can see areas of both Kashmir and Jammu Divisions. Also the spot itself can be a great resting place for people traveling from Srinagar to Kishtwar or Doda and back.

Sinthan Top is the South-East end of Breng Valley (The Golden Crown of Kashmir) and is 48 km from famous Kokernag spring. The nearest hotels are located at Kokernag and Daksum ranging from extremely budget accommodation in private and Government huts to deluxe hotels. One should be able to book a night in a hotel or hut between 1500 to 3500 rupees.

One can plan to visit Lihinwan and the famous Margan Top in the Margan Valley and Inshan which are located in the same area.

Vailoo-Singhpora tunnel 

Although the tunnel plans to bypass Sinthan pass were approved in principle years ago, the action is still awaited by the government. Varying lengths of tunnel have been reported by media but maps would suggest a length of about 10 to 14 km.

References

Tourist attractions in Anantnag district
Mountain passes of Jammu and Kashmir